The Miss Bahamas 2011 pageant was held on May 6, 2011. Twenty-six candidates competed for the national crown. The chosen winner represented The Bahamas at the Miss Universe 2011 pageant. The costume of the winner of the best national costume award will be used at Miss Universe 2011. Miss World Bahamas entered Miss World 2011. The First Runner Up entered Miss Intercontinental, the Second Runner Up entered Miss Supranational, and the Third Runner Up entered Top Model of the World.

Final results

Special awards

Miss Photogenic - Anastagia Pierre (Capital City)
Miss Congeniality - Sharie Delva (Freeport)
Best National Costume - Aisha Delaney (Acklins)

Official delegates

External links

Miss Bahamas
Bahamas, The
2011 in the Bahamas